Lingenfelter Performance Engineering (LPE) is an American automotive engineering company specializing in high-performance automobile modifications, specifically engines and induction systems. Now headquartered in Brighton, Michigan the company was founded by and named for NHRA driver John Lingenfelter in Decatur, IN. Over the decades since its founding, LPE has been creating high-performance versions of many GM vehicles, such as the F-Bodies (Camaro, Firebird), B Bodies (Impala SS, Caprice, Roadmaster, Fleetwood), Corvette, CTS-V, GTO, Silverado, Suburban, Tahoe, Escalade, Denali, SSR, Hummer H2, and Sierra. Furthermore, it has also created performance enhancement packages for the Dodge Viper and Plymouth Prowler.

In January 1998, MotorTrend tested a Chevrolet Tahoe modified and tuned by Lingenfelter, powered by a 396 (6.5L) cubic inch Chevrolet V8 and achieved a 5.1-second 0-60 time as well as a 0.9g lateral acceleration figure. The SUV completed the quarter mile in 13.8 seconds at 96 mph. These numbers matched the performance figures of a base model C4 Corvette and GMC Syclones/Typhoons of that era. Motor Trend also tested an LPE-built Impala SS that had the same performance numbers as the last generation M5 (0-60 4.7 sec) due to its bored and stroked LT-1 (displacement rose to 383 in3 and horsepower rose to 425). Another LPE vehicle was featured in the June 1996 issue of Car and Driver: A special C4 Corvette with a 427.6 in3 engine that attained a top speed of 212 mph. LPE's 2001 Corvette 427 twin-turbo with 800 rear-wheel horsepower accomplished a 0-60 mph acceleration in 1.97 seconds. Another LPE vehicle that the company developed and marketed to customers which has been one of their most powerful vehicles offered to date was a 2006 twin-turbo Corvette Z06 with 1,109 rear wheel horsepower.

The current owner of Lingenfelter Performance Engineering is Ken Lingenfelter.

References

External links
 Lingenfelter Performance Engineering

Automotive companies of the United States
Companies based in Indiana